Thomas Hacket, D.D. was an Anglican bishop in the second half of the seventeenth century.

An Englishman, he was educated at Trinity College, Dublin. He was Vicar of Cheshunt before his appointment as Dean of Cork on 31 May 1661.  He was appointed a Chaplain to King Charles II of England in 1662. In 1672 he became  Bishop of Down and Connor; and held this See until he was deprived in 1694. He died in 1697

References

Alumni of Trinity College Dublin
17th-century Anglican bishops in Ireland
Deans of Cork
Bishops of Down and Connor